The State House may refer to:

 State House (Mauritius)
 State House (Tanzania)